Crow is an unincorporated community in Lane County, Oregon, United States.

Crow post office was established in 1874 and named after community founders James Andrew Jackson Crow and Helen Frisk Crow, pioneers who came to Oregon by wagon train. The Coyote Creek Bridge, a covered bridge in Crow and the site of an Indian massacre, has been on the National Register of Historic Places since 1979.

See also
 Applegate Trail

References

External links
 Crow Applegate Lorane School District
 Coyote Creek Covered Bridge

Unincorporated communities in Lane County, Oregon
1874 establishments in Oregon
Populated places established in 1874
Unincorporated communities in Oregon